The Newfoundland Act was an Act of the Parliament of the United Kingdom that confirmed and gave effect to the Terms of Union agreed to between the then-separate Dominions of Canada and Newfoundland on March 23, 1949. It was originally titled the British North America Act 1949, but was renamed in Canada on the patriation of the Canadian Constitution from the United Kingdom in 1982.

In exchange for Newfoundland becoming a province, the Canadian government took over the Newfoundland Railway, Newfoundland Airport (now Gander International Airport), public broadcasting, telegraph services and other services that fell under federal control. The federal government assumed responsibility for Newfoundland's debt.

Newfoundland was also given statutory subsidies, a special subsidy of $1.1 million, the right to enter into tax rental agreements with the federal government and an additional transitional grant of $3.5 million, diminishing by 10 per cent per year for a total of 12 years. Also, as a safety net, it was agreed a Royal Commission would review finances.

Previous Newfoundland Acts

Prior to the 1949 Act there were a handful of Acts with revisions to the Newfoundland's Constitution:

 Newfoundland Act 1699 - encourage and established trade (fisheries) links in the region; also called King William's Act
 Newfoundland Act 1842 - established an appointed upper Legislative Council and elected lower House of Assembly
 Newfoundland Act 1933 - suspended responsible government with the General Assembly of Newfoundland and Labrador dissolved and established rule by Newfoundland Commission

See also
 Malaysia Act 1963
 Hong Kong Act 1985

References

External links
 Newfoundland Act text

 British North American Act, 1949 (Newfoundland Act), audio reading of act by LibriVox (57m23s)

Acts of the Parliament of the United Kingdom concerning Canada
Canada and the Commonwealth of Nations
Constitution of Canada
Political history of Newfoundland and Labrador
United Kingdom Acts of Parliament 1949
Legal history of Canada
1949 in Canada
1949 in international relations
Dominion of Newfoundland law
1949 in Newfoundland
March 1949 events in Canada
United Kingdom and the Commonwealth of Nations